U.S. Route 150 (US 150) in Indiana is a  east–west highway that travels from the Illinois state line east of Paris, Illinois to Louisville, Kentucky at the Kentucky state line. A section of US 150 from New Goshen to Vincennes travels north–south instead of east–west. US 150 travels concurrently with its parent route, US 50, from Vincennes to Shoals. Between West Terre Haute and Terre Haute, US 150 travels along part of the historic National Road. Also, from Vincennes to New Albany, the route is designated as part of Indiana's Historic Pathways, as it roughly parallels what was then part of the Buffalo Trace.

Route description

Illinois state line to Vincennes
After crossing the Illinois state line, US 150 briefly travels along the Vermillion–Vigo county line. The roadway soon gradually curves south, serving Libertyville, Shirkieville, and New Goshen. As US 150 approaches Terre Haute, the route largely parallels US 41 east of the Wabash River as well as SR 63. Along the way, US 150 serves St. Mary-of-the-Woods and the college it serves, Ferguson Hill, and West Terre Haute. The route then travels eastward, serving Taylorville before crossing over the Wabash River. Along with crossing the river and entering Terre Haute, US 150 splits into a one-way pair, with eastbound traffic using Ohio Street and westbound traffic using Cherry Street.

In the city of Terre Haute, as the pair approaches downtown, as well as the Vigo County Courthouse and the Indiana State University, the route then turns south along US 41 (3rd Street), a two-way, divided roadway. As a concurrency, both US 41 and US 150 serve the CANDLES Holocaust Museum and Education Center, I-70/US 40, and the Terre Haute Action Track. Both routes also serve Southwood, Allendale, and Woodgate. Near the Terre Haute campus of the Ivy Tech Community College, both routes meet SR 641 at a trumpet interchange. Through the rest of Vigo County, the roadway serves Youngstown and Pimento. The road then serves several more towns in Sullivan County: Farmersburg, Standard, Shelburn, Sullivan, Paxton, and Carlisle (which serves the Wabash Valley Correctional Facility).

On their way to Vincennes, US 41 and US 150 bend slightly west, connecting Oaktown, Busseron, and Emison. As both routes approach the city limit of Vincennes, they come across SR 67 at a modified diamond interchange and then US 50 at a cloverleaf interchange. Drivers wanting to stay on US 41/US 150 would have to use a one-lane ramp, with southbound traffic using a loop ramp and northbound traffic using the outer ramp. US 41 and US 150 then travel concurrently with US 50 via an expressway bypass around Vincennes. However, this triplex concurrency is brief as both US 50 and US 150 soon turn eastward at a directional Y interchange.

Vincennes to Kentucky state line

After US 150 splits away from US 41, the route runs concurrently with just its parent route, US 50. As a four-lane divided highway, both routes serve Fritchton, Wheatland, and Maysville. Between Maysville and I-69, the roadway serves as a southern bypass of Washington. As a bypass, the concurrency serves South Washington at the intersection with SR 57. After the road serves I-69 at a diamond interchange, the roadway downgrades to a two-lane undivided highway. The routes then serve Black Oak, Montgomery, and Cannelburg. In Loogootee, both routes briefly run north concurrently with US 231. Between Loogootee and Shoals, the roadway parallels the East Fork White River. As the two routes enter Shoals, the concurrency splits, with US 50 traveling slightly northeastward and US 150 traveling slightly southeastward.

Continuing onwards, US 150 alone serves several more towns: Lacy, Natchez, and Roland. In Prospect (located north of West Baden Springs and French Lick), SR 56 begins to run concurrently with US 150 all the way to Paoli. Also, in Paoli, SR 37 joins the concurrency for one block before departing at Courthouse Square (which surrounds Orange County Courthouse). After US 150 is alone once again, it then serves more towns: Chambersburg, Rego, Hardinsburg, Fredericksburg, Palmyra, Greenville, Galena, Mount St. Francis, and Floyds Knobs. As the route approaches New Albany, US 150 encounters I-64 at a trumpet interchange. After beginning to run concurrently with I-64 and SR 62, SR 62 then exits the concurrency onto I-265 (exit 121) at a directional T interchange. After serving downtown New Albany (exit 123), both I-64 and US 150 cross above the Ohio River via the Sherman Minton Bridge, crossing the Kentucky state line and into Louisville.

History
Before 1926, a portion of SR 10 (from Terre Haute to Vincennes) and most of SR 5 (from Vincennes to New Albany) roughly traveled via the present-day routing of US 150. Then, in October 1926, a large amount of state roads in Indiana were supplanted by their U.S. Route counterpart. Among those, SR 5 was replaced by parts of US 50 and US 150. However, at that time, US 150 as a whole ran from Shoals to New Albany. Then, in 1934, US 150 was extended from both ends. The route extends southeast via the Kentucky & Indiana Bridge to enter Louisville, Kentucky, and beyond. It also extended northwest via US 50, US 41, and SR 46 (the latter being superseded by US 150), before entering Illinois.

Major intersections

References

 Indiana
U.S. Highways in Indiana
Transportation in Vermillion County, Indiana
Transportation in Vigo County, Indiana
Transportation in Sullivan County, Indiana
Transportation in Knox County, Indiana
Transportation in Daviess County, Indiana
Transportation in Martin County, Indiana
Transportation in Orange County, Indiana
Transportation in Washington County, Indiana
Transportation in Harrison County, Indiana
Transportation in Floyd County, Indiana